Felicito Ávila is a Honduran politician. He stood as a candidate for the Christian Democratic Party of Honduras (DC) in the 2009 Honduran general election.

References

Living people
Christian Democratic Party of Honduras politicians
Year of birth missing (living people)